Gennadius of Constantinople may refer to:

 Gennadius I of Constantinople, Ecumenical Patriarch in 458–471
 Gennadius II of Constantinople, Ecumenical Patriarch in 1454–1456, 1463 and 1464–1465